Yaserabad (also Romanized as Yāserābād; also known as Khāneh Ḩeşār, Khān Ḩeşār, and Pas Hesār) is a village in Howmeh Rural District, in the Central District of Shirvan County, North Khorasan Province, Iran. At the 2006 census, its population was 197, in 55 families.

References 

Populated places in Shirvan County